Yazīd ibn Ziyād ibn Abīhi (died 683/84) was a general of the Umayyad Caliphate responsible for the province of Sijistan during the reign of Caliph Yazid I between 680/81 and his death. He was appointed by one of his brothers Ubayd Allah or Salm in 680 or 681 in their capacity as governors of Basra or Khurasan, respectively. While Yazid was posted as amir (overall commander, probably with fiscal and civil responsibilities) of Sijistan, his brother Abu Ubayda was made field commander. In 683/84, the two brothers led an expedition against the Zunbil of Zabulistan and the Turk Shahis of Kabul. However, their forces were routed and Yazid was slain, while Abu Ubayda was captured.

References

Bibliography

Year of birth unknown
684 deaths
7th-century Arabs
Banu Thaqif
Generals of the Umayyad Caliphate
Umayyad governors of Sijistan
Medieval Arabs killed in battle